is a Japanese archer of South Korean descent who won a bronze medal in the women's team event at the 2012 Summer Olympics.

Early and personal life
Hayakawa was born Um Hye-ryeon (hanja:) in Anyang, Gyeonggi Province in South Korea. She competed in archery in high school and was later a member of a professional team, though she never qualified for the South Korean national team. Hayakawa became a Japanese citizen in 2007 having left South Korea to study on an archery scholarship, enrolling at the Nippon Sport Science University.

Ren has an older sister, Nami who is also an Olympic archer and competed in the 2008 Summer Olympics

Career
In 2011 Hayakawa was selected to be a member of the Japanese Olympic squad for the 2012 Summer Olympics in London. She became the second person in her family to compete at the Olympics after her sister Nami Hayakawa, who had previously competed for Japan in archery at the 2008 Summer Olympics.  In London, Hayakawa and teammates Kaori Kawanaka and Miki Kanie advanced to the bronze medal match of the women's team event, where they defeated Russia by two points to earn Japan's first Olympic medal in team archery. She also competed in the women's individual event, losing in the third round to South Korea's Ki Bo-bae. 

Hayakawa later won bronze in the women's team recurve competition at the 2014 Asian Games alongside Kawanaka and Yuki Hayashi.

Hayakawa was the face of Adidas by Stella McCartney's Spring Summer 2021 Campaign directed by Japanese photographer, Monika Mogi.

References

External links
 

Japanese female archers
Japanese people of Korean descent
Living people
1987 births
Olympic archers of Japan
Archers at the 2012 Summer Olympics
Olympic bronze medalists for Japan
Olympic medalists in archery
Medalists at the 2012 Summer Olympics
Naturalized citizens of Japan
Asian Games medalists in archery
Archers at the 2014 Asian Games
Asian Games bronze medalists for Japan
Medalists at the 2014 Asian Games
South Korean emigrants to Japan
Archers at the 2020 Summer Olympics